Gruppo 7 was a group of Italian architects who wanted to reform architecture by the adoption of Rationalism. It was formed in 1926 by Luigi Figini, Guido Frette, Sebastiano Larco, Gino Pollini, Carlo Enrico Rava, Giuseppe Terragni and Ubaldo Castagnoli, replaced the following year by Adalberto Libera.

Gruppo 7 declared that intent was to strike a middle ground between the classicism and the industrially-inspired architecture.

References

External links 
 

Architecture groups